Nemegtbaatar is a genus of mammal from the Upper Cretaceous Period of what is now Mongolia.  It existed in the company of much larger dinosaurs, found together in the Nemegt Basin. This creature was a member of the extinct order Multituberculata. It is within the suborder Cimolodonta and is a member of the superfamily Djadochtatherioidea. It was a hopping, gerboa-like species.

 
The genus Nemegtbaatar (Kielan-Jaworowska Z., 1974) is known by the species Nemegtbaatar gobiensis found in the Santonian to Campanian (Upper Cretaceous) Barun Goyot Formation of Mongolia. "Compared to all extant mammals, the braincase in Nemegtbaatar and Chulsanbaatar is primitive." (Hurum, 1998). "All extant mammals" includes monotremes, such as the duck-billed platypus, despite its residual egg-laying habit.

At least one specimen is in the Institute of Paleobiology collection of the Polish Academy of Science at Warsaw, (ZPAL MgM-1/76).

References

Further reading 
 The abstract of Hurum (1998),  The braincase of two Late Cretaceous Asian multituberculates studied by serial sections. Acta Palaeontologica Polonica 43(1), p 21-52.
 Kielan-Jaworowska (1974), Multituberculate succession in the Late Cretaceous of the Gobi Desert (Mongolia). Palaeontologica Polonica, 30, p. 23-44.
 Kielan-Jaworowska Z & Hurum JH (2001), "Phylogeny and Systematics of multituberculate mammals." Paleontology 44, p. 389-429.
 Much of this information has been derived from  MESOZOIC MAMMALS; Djadochtatherioidea, an Internet directory.

Cimolodonts
Santonian life
Campanian life
Late Cretaceous mammals of Asia
Fossils of Mongolia
Fossil taxa described in 1974
Prehistoric mammal genera